Caroline Mason may refer to:
 Caroline Atherton Mason (1823–1890), American poet
 Caroline Mason (charity executive), British charity executive
 Caroline B. Mason, American head of school for the Albany Academy